STS Mir is a three-masted, full-rigged training ship, based in St. Petersburg, Russia. It was built in 1987 at the Lenin Shipyard in Gdańsk, Poland. 

Mir is the second largest of six sister ships designed by Polish naval architect Zygmunt Choreń and weighs 2,385 tonnes.  It is 109.2 m long, with a beam of 13.9 m and a draught of 6.3 m.  The main mast is 52 m high and along with the other masts supports a total sail area of 2,771 m2.

Its sister ships are Dar Młodzieży, Druzhba, Pallada, Khersones, and Nadezhda.  Mir is 8 m shorter than the second longest current sailing ship, the STS Sedov (117.5 m). Its shipowner is the Admiral Makarov State Maritime Academy (AMSMA) in Saint Petersburg.

Background
This ship was originally constructed as a cadet training ship, designed for carrying between 70 and 144 cadets. The total transport capacity is 199 people.

Achievements
Mir has taken part in races, including the annual The Tall Ships' Races organised by Sail Training International. In the Grand Regatta Columbus 1992, celebrating the discovery of America by Christopher Columbus in 1492, Mir came out as the winner.

STS Mir at Trafalgar 2005  

During the afternoon of the 28 June 2005 Elizabeth II, as Lord High Admiral of the United Kingdom, embarked on board HMS Endurance and, escorted by THV Patricia, set sail to review a fleet of over 167 ships from over 30 nations.

See also
List of large sailing vessels

External links

Official website of STS MIR

Mir
Ships of the Soviet Union
Poland–Soviet Union relations
Full-rigged ships
Ships built in Gdańsk